Grupo Radio Centro is a Mexico City-based owner and operator of radio stations. It owns 30 radio stations in Mexico and the United States, including 8 radio stations in Mexico City.

History
Radio Centro's origins date to 1946, when Francisco Aguirre Jiménez formed the Cadena Radio Continental to operate XEQR-AM 1030 and new station XERC-AM 790 in Mexico City. Organización Radio Centro was formed in 1952, and the current company was founded in 1971.

In 1965, it founded OIR (Organización Impulsora de la Radio), which syndicates Radio Centro's formats to stations across Mexico. Its non-Mexico City business extended further in the 1980s, when Radio Centro began selling its formats outside the United States (in 1983) and created Cadena Radio Centro (in 1986) to manage this portion of its operations. Meanwhile, in Mexico City, it had expanded to five AM stations and three new FM outlets. Radio Centro was the second media company to place its FM towers on Cerro del Chiquihuite, to the north of the city, though they are now located elsewhere.

In 1994, it sold Cadena Radio Centro, picked up (and promptly shed) an investment in Heftel Broadcasting (now known as Univision Radio), and bought 33% of Radiodifusión Red (which it would later own outright). The absorption of Radiodifusión Red, also known as Radio Programas de México, brought three additional Mexico City stations into Radio Centro's stable.

It also built a new building on the west side of Mexico City, known as the Trébol Radio Centro (or "Radio Centro Clover") in 1993. It also launched an initial public offering on the BMV (where Grupo Radio Centro stock continues to trade) and the NYSE (where it delisted in 2013).

In May 2000, Televisa attempted to buy GRC and announced an agreement in principle for a merger, but the acquisition failed due to marketplace concerns. The Federal Competition Commission recommended that Televisa sell some stations, and ultimately four months after the announcement, talks ended. Other reasons for the acquisition's failure included dissent within the Aguirre family and a dispute over GRC's valuation. Another roadblock was that newscaster José Gutiérrez Vivó, who hosted the Monitor newscasts on Radio Red, refused to work with Televisa.

In 2012, GRC acquired 25% of KXOS FM in Los Angeles, three years after signing a local marketing agreement to take control of the station's programming.

On March 11, 2015, Radio Centro won one of two concession packages to build and operate a national television network. However, Radio Centro ended up not paying the 3 billion pesos to secure the concession.

Seeking to limit costs after the television concession fiasco, in June 2015, shareholders approved a merger of Radio Centro with Controladora Radio México and GRM Radiodifusión, two components of Grupo Radio México. The merger added 30 radio stations to Grupo Radio Centro's portfolio and marks its first major expansion outside of Mexico City.

In November 2016, GRC took control of Univision Radio's El Paso cluster, consisting of KBNA-FM, KQBU and KAMA, by local marketing agreement, and filed with the FCC to buy 25% of the stations, with the remaining shares being held by a US citizen.

On November 27, 2017, a fire affected the company's main offices, forcing it to briefly suspend the broadcasts of all its Mexico City stations and relocate to an alternate site.

Stations

Mexico City
XEN-AM 690
XERC-AM 790 (off air)
XEQR-AM 1030
XERED-AM 1110 (repeater of XHRED-FM)
XHRED-FM 88.1
XHFAJ-FM 91.3
XEJP-FM 93.7
XEQR-FM 107.3

Guadalajara
XEDKR-AM 700 (repeater of XHRED-FM)

Monterrey
XEMN-AM 600 (off air)
XEH-AM 1420
XESTN-AM 1540 (repeater of XHRED-FM)
XHQQ-FM 93.3
XHMF-FM 104.5 (concession held by Grupo Radiorama) (repeater of XHFAJ-FM)

Torreón
XETB-AM 1350

Ciudad Juarez
 XHEM-FM 103.5 and XEJCC-AM 720 (concession held by Grupo Radiorama)
 XHTO-FM 104.3 (concession held by Grupo Radiorama)
 XEJ-AM 970 (concession held by Grupo Radiorama)

Los Mochis
 XHECU-FM 91.7
 XHCW-FM 96.5
 XHORF-FM 99.7
 XHPNK-FM 103.5

Other cities
XEAA-AM 1340 Mexicali, B.C. (off air)
XHKF-FM 90.5 Iguala, Gro.
XHKC-FM 100.9 Oaxaca, Oax.
XEFE-AM 790 Nuevo Laredo, Tamau.

United States                
KBNA-FM 97.5 El Paso (25% ownership, through owner 97.5 Licensee TX, LLC)
KAMA AM 750 El Paso (25% ownership, through owner 97.5 Licensee TX, LLC)
KQBU AM 920 El Paso (25% ownership, through owner 97.5 Licensee TX, LLC)

Former stations 
XEJP-AM 1150 Mexico City (1955-2020, sold to Grupo Acustik)
XENET-AM 1320 Mexico City (1958-2000, passed to Infored, went defunct in 2008)
XEINFO-AM 1560 Mexico City (1979-2000; 2011-2017, passed to Infored, in turn sold to Eduardo Henkel; migrated to 105.3 FM)
XEEST-AM 1440 Mexico City (1961-2019, operated by Grupo Siete beginning in 1996, sold to Grupo Siete in 2019)
XHFO-FM 92.1 Mexico City (owned by Grupo Siete, operated by GRC from 1993 to 2019)
XERC-FM 97.7 Mexico City (1974-2020, sold to MVS Radio)
XEUNO-AM 1120 Guadalajara (1992-2020, sold to Grupo Acustik)
XHDK-FM 94.7 Guadalajara (owned by Grupo Radiorama, operated by GRC from 2002 to 2020)
XHKB-FM 99.9 Guadalajara (sold to Multimedios Radio)
XHVOZ-FM 107.5 Guadalajara (sold to Grupo Audiorama Comunicaciones)
XEFB-AM 630 Monterrey (1973-2023, sold to Grupo Acustik)
XHSP-FM 99.7 Monterrey (1973-2021, sold to El Heraldo de México)
XHRPO-FM 97.7 Oaxaca (sold to El Heraldo de México)
XHRRF-FM 88.5 Mérida (operated to Peninsula Studios)
XHYK-FM 101.5 Mérida (operated to Peninsula Studios)
XEAZ-AM 1270 Tijuana (2008-2021, Sold to PSN)
XHWN-FM 93.9 Torreón (sold to Multimedios Radio)
XHETOR-FM 99.9 Torreón (sold to Multimedios Radio)
XHRCA-FM 102.7 Torreón (sold to Multimedios Radio)
XHRPU-FM 102.9 Durango (sold to Multimedios Radio)
KXOS-FM 93.9 Los Angeles (2009-2019, sold to Meruelo Group)
XHXV-FM 88.9 León (sold to Grupo Radiorama)
XHEPR-FM 99.1 Ciudad Juárez (owned by Grupo Radiorama, operated by GRC from 2021 to 2022)
 XEPZ-AM 1190 (owned by Grupo Radiorama, operated by GRC from 2010 to 2022)
XHCCQ-FM 91.5 Cancún (owned by Grupo Radiorama, operated by GRC from 2009 to 2022)
XHPBCQ-FM 94.9 Cancún (2019-2022, sold to Promo Éxitos)

Non-radio
Radio Centro owned XHDF-TV channel 13 in Mexico City from its 1968 launch to 1972, when it was expropriated by state financier SOMEX.

References

External links
Official website 

 
Mass media companies of Mexico
Mexican radio networks
Mexican companies established in 1946
Mass media companies established in 1946